First Lady of Bangladesh is the unofficial title given to the spouse of the president of Bangladesh. Prominent former first ladies include former prime minister Khaleda Zia and former opposition leader Rowshan Ershad.
The incumbent first lady is Rashida Hamid.

The title should not be confused with the husband or wife of the prime minister of Bangladesh.

Duties 
Duties of the first lady are receiving foreign leaders along with the president, conversing with the spouse of the foreign leader, being a role model for the people of the nation, promoting of policies by the government urging public support of policies, and advocating for socio-economic change. An example of this is Rowshan Ershad who called for improvements in women's rights.

Appointment 
The first lady takes up her role and office after the inauguration of the president of Bangladesh who is appointed by the Jatiya Sangsad. After the inauguration she resides with her husband at Bangabhaban.

List of first ladies

References

Spouses of leaders of Bangladesh
 
Bangladesh